Ralph Giacomarro (born January 17, 1961) is a former American football punter with a 4-year career in the National Football League (NFL).

Born in Passaic, New Jersey and raised in Saddle Brook, New Jersey, Giacomarro attended Saddle Brook High/Middle School.

References

1961 births
Living people
People from Saddle Brook, New Jersey
Sportspeople from Bergen County, New Jersey
Sportspeople from Passaic, New Jersey
American football punters
Penn State Nittany Lions football players
Atlanta Falcons players
Denver Broncos players
Players of American football from New Jersey
National Football League replacement players